HMS Carron was a 20-gun Cyrus-class sixth-rate post ship of the Royal Navy built in 1813 by Edward Adams, at Bucklers Hard in Hampshire. She was wrecked in 1820.

Career
Carron was first commissioned in January 1814 under Captain Robert Cavendish Spencer (a son of George Spencer, 2nd Earl Spencer). At Bermuda, on 4 July 1814, Carron and  embarked a company-strength force of Royal Marines, commanded by Edward Nicolls, for deployment on the Gulf Coast. They arrived at the mouth of the Apalachicola River on 14 August 1814. The vessels then took part in the unsuccessful British attack on Fort Bowyer on 15 September 1814 in which Hermes was lost. For much of the autumn, the Carron was at Pensacola, until General Andrew Jackson's numerically superior forces expelled the British at the start of November 1814.

Shortly thereafter, Carron made two lucrative captures when on 29 November she captured the schooners Hirondelle and Dos Amigos. For Spencer, the prize money was worth several years' pay. For an ordinary seaman, the money was worth a half to three-quarters of a year's pay.

Under the rules of prize-money, she shared in the proceeds of the capture of the American vessels in the Battle of Lake Borgne on 14 December 1814, in the run up to the Battle of New Orleans. In 1821 the survivors of the British  flotilla shared in the distribution of head-money arising from the capture of five American gun-boats and sundry bales of cotton. Captain Spencer was mentioned in dispatches for his part in reconnoitering the Bayou Catalan, so as to determine a suitable location for British forces to disembark. At the time of the besieging of Fort Bowyer in February 1815, Captain Spencer was among the sailors landed near Mobile, and was second in command of the Naval party.

Carron was moored off St Vincent Island, near Apalachicola Bay, on 27 March 1815, and stayed in this area for the next month or so. On 18 April, her commander was reappointed to command  . When the British evacuated, a number of refugees were embarked on 20 April, and Lieutenant Armbrister was embarked on 22 April. When Carron arrived at New Providence in the Bahamas on 6 May, he disembarked. The refugees disembarked when Carron arrived at Bermuda on 22 May 1815.

Lieutenant James B. Tathnell became Carrons acting temporary commander in 1814, during Captain Spencer's absence. Sir Alexander Cochrane rewarded Spencer his efforts in Louisiana and Florida by appointing him to command Cydnus in April 1815 after her captain had died. Captain Nicholas Pateshall commanded Carron from April 1815 until she was paid off in August 1816 at Portsmouth. Carron was recommissioned in May 1818 under Commander John Furneaux, for service in the East Indies.

Fate
She was wrecked on 6 July 1820 six miles north of the Black Pagoda, which was 30 miles north of Puri. Carron had been sailing south from the Sandheads, for Madras when she grounded at 3 am while her crew thought she was 60 miles off the coast. Despite all efforts to free her, she quickly took on water, lost her boats and broke apart. In the morning, the survivors found that she was only a quarter of a mile offshore. Those who could made it ashore; in all, she lost a lieutenant of artillery, the master, and 19 crewmen to drowning. The court martial board blamed a strong, unexpected current for the loss.

On 13 March 1821  arrived at Gravesend with Commander John Furneaux, his officers, and 15 of the crew of Carron. Borodino had come from Trincomalee via the Cape of Good Hope and Saint Helena.

Notes

References

External links
 

 

Cyrus-class post ships
Ships built on the Beaulieu River
1813 ships
War of 1812 ships of the United Kingdom
Maritime incidents in July 1820